Poltera is a surname. People with that name include:

 Celeste Poltera (active late 1980s), Swiss bobsledder
 Gebhard Poltera (1923-2008), Swiss ice hockey player
 Ulrich Poltera (1922-1994), Swiss ice hockey player

See also
 Madura State Polytechnic, aka POLTERA